Matteo Franzoni (Genoa, 2 October 1682 - Genoa, 11 January 1767) was the 165th Doge of the Republic of Genoa.

Biography 
The biennial mandate of Doge Matteo Franzoni was remembered in the annals and by the most illustrious Genoese historians, especially those most closely linked to the clergy, as unpopular and despotic; he was criticized in his choices for having convened the Senate a few times and in any case for assuming totalitarian and independent leadership, sometimes even trespassing beyond his own authorities and roles. And precisely against the religious power of the Holy See, Doge Franzoni once again promoted, especially after the refusal from Rome to the proposal of the Republic of Genoa for the appointment and control of the various bishops and priests residing in the tormented island-colony of Corsica. The term in office ended on August 22 of the same year, contrary to the expectations of a large part of the nobility and of the Genoese people, the supreme trade unions pronounced positively for the subsequent appointment of Franzoni as perpetual procurator, a charge due to the former doges. He died in Genoa on 11 January 1767.

See also 

 Republic of Genoa
 Doge of Genoa

References 

18th-century Doges of Genoa
1682 births
1767 deaths